The 1993 Hamburg state election was held on 19 September 1993 to elect the members of the 15th Hamburg Parliament. The incumbent government of the Social Democratic Party (SPD) lost its majority. The election saw the entry of the Statt Party into Parliament, with which the SPD formed a coalition. First Mayor Henning Voscherau continued in office.

Parties
The table below lists parties represented in the 14th Hamburg Parliament.

Election result

|-
! colspan="2" | Party
! Votes
! %
! +/-
! Seats 
! +/-
! Seats %
|-
| bgcolor=| 
| align=left | Social Democratic Party (SPD)
| align=right| 341,688
| align=right| 40.4
| align=right| 7.6
| align=right| 58
| align=right| 3
| align=right| 47.9
|-
| bgcolor=| 
| align=left | Christian Democratic Union (CDU)
| align=right| 212,186
| align=right| 25.1
| align=right| 10.0
| align=right| 36
| align=right| 8
| align=right| 29.8
|-
| bgcolor=| 
| align=left | Green Alternative List (GAL)
| align=right| 114,261
| align=right| 13.5
| align=right| 6.3
| align=right| 19
| align=right| 10
| align=right| 6.6
|-
| bgcolor=darkblue| 
| align=left | Statt Party (STATT)
| align=right| 46,894
| align=right| 5.6
| align=right| New
| align=right| 8
| align=right| New
| align=right| 6.6
|-
! colspan=8|
|-
| bgcolor=| 
| align=left | The Republicans (REP)
| align=right| 40,856
| align=right| 4.8
| align=right| 3.6
| align=right| 0
| align=right| ±0
| align=right| 0
|-
| bgcolor=| 
| align=left | Free Democratic Party (FDP)
| align=right| 35,236
| align=right| 4.2
| align=right| 1.2
| align=right| 0
| align=right| 7
| align=right| 0
|-
| bgcolor=| 
| align=left | German People's Union (DVU)
| align=right| 23,618
| align=right| 2.8
| align=right| 2.8
| align=right| 0
| align=right| ±0
| align=right| 0
|-
| bgcolor=grey|
| align=left | The Grays – Gray Panthers (GRAUE)
| align=right| 13,329
| align=right| 1.6
| align=right| 0.7
| align=right| 0
| align=right| ±0
| align=right| 0
|-
| bgcolor=|
| align=left | Others
| align=right| 16,832
| align=right| 2.0
| align=right| 
| align=right| 0
| align=right| ±0
| align=right| 0
|-
! align=right colspan=2| Total
! align=right| 844,902
! align=right| 100.0
! align=right| 
! align=right| 121
! align=right| ±0
! align=right| 
|-
! align=right colspan=2| Voter turnout
! align=right| 
! align=right| 69.9
! align=right| 3.8
! align=right| 
! align=right| 
! align=right| 
|}

See also
Elections in Germany
Elections in Hamburg
Hamburg state elections in the Weimar Republic

References

1993 elections in Germany
1993 state election
1993
September 1993 events in Europe